Bush was an early 1970s Canadian rock band. It evolved from the club act Mandala, which had a minor Canadian hit with the song "Love-Itis". 

Bush consisted of ex-Mandala bandmates Domenic Troiano (vocals, guitar), Roy Kenner (vocals), Hugh Sullivan (organ), Pentti Glan (drums), and Prakash John (vocals, bass).  The group released a single eponymous album in 1970, on the RCA label in Canada and Dunhill in the US, and toured with label mates Steppenwolf and Three Dog Night. Three Dog Night released one of their songs, "I Can Hear You Calling" as the B-side of their successful single "Joy to the World".  The song, co-written by Troiano, Kenner, Glan and Sullivan, also appeared on Three Dog Night's Naturally album.  Bush was short-lived as a band, but its jazz-influenced rock influenced many musicians.

Name dispute
Bush became newsworthy again in 1995, as the result of an intellectual property dispute with the British alternative band Bush. As Troiano still owned the rights to that name, the British band was forced to release their albums in Canada as "Bush X". In late April 1997, Troiano and Gavin Rossdale reached an agreement under which Rossdale's band was permitted to use the name Bush without the letter X, in exchange for donating $20,000 each to the Starlight Foundation and the Canadian Music Therapy Fund.

Subsequent careers
All of the band members continued in music after the breakup of Bush.  Kenner and Troiano joined The James Gang, following the departure of Joe Walsh.  They performed together on the albums Passin' Thru and Straight Shooter, after which Troiano left to join The Guess Who.  Kenner stayed with The James Gang, then with lead guitarist Tommy Bolin, for two further albums, Bang and Miami. John and Glan became session musicians, who also toured with Alice Cooper and Lou Reed. Troiano later developed a successful solo career, which also included Kenner at various times.  John later fronted a Toronto-based rhythm and blues band, The Lincolns, which continues to play today.  In 2005, Domenic Troiano died at age of 59, of prostate cancer.

Discography
Bush (1970)

References

External links
 The Canadian Encyclopedia: Domenic Troiano
 CanConRox: Bush
 Bandas de 1 Álbum: Bush

Musical groups established in 1970
Canadian rock music groups
Musical groups from Toronto
Dunhill Records artists
1970 establishments in Ontario